The Badge of Honor of the League of Civil Defense was instituted in 1956 by King Frederik IX and may be awarded to persons who have done noteworthy deeds for the Civil Defense cause, over a prolonged period of time (minimum 15 years).
The medal is awarded by the President of the Danish Civil Defense Association, Beredskabsforbundet.

History
The first notion of a medal was on October 8th 1953, when the Association of Police Chiefs in Denmark wrote the Civil Defense Agency (later the Danish Emergency Management Agency), asking for in institution of an award to civilians who had made significant contribution to the police, for example in the creation of evacuation plans. 
The Civil Defense Agency passed to task onto the Civil Defense Association, and in 1956 the statutes of the medal was approved by the Ministry of Interior and later the King.

The Badge of Honour was established on the November 30th 1956 and was first awarded on June 17th, on the birthday of hofjægermester Torben Foss. Foss was the founder and first president of Dansk Luftværnsforening (Danish Air Guard Association) (later the Civil Defense Association).

The Civil Defense Association changed its name from CivilforsvarsForbundet to Beredskabsforbundet in the mid 2000s and on October 1st 2007, after petition from the Ministry of Defense, Her Majesty Queen Margrethe II approved that the medal changed names from Civilforsvars-Forbundets Hæderstegn to Beredskabsforbundets Hæderstegn.

Criteria
There are 3 groups of people who may be awarded the medal:
 Persons, who over a prolonged period of time, have done noteworthy work within the field of Civil Defense
 This group may be volunteers and employees under the Civil Defense League
 "A prolonged period of time" normally means at least 15 years
 "Noteworthy work" means work above and beyond that of the average
 5-6 medals may be given to this group annually
 Persons who in a special degree have made themselves noteworthy in their work for the Civil Defense cause
 This may, for example, be fire chiefs who over a period of years have helped strengthen the use of volunteers
 4-5 medals may be given to this group annually. The Danish Emergency Management Agency (DEMA) controls the use of 2 of these.
 Other persons who have done noteworthy work for the Civil Defense cause
 This group is most often politicians and other public key-figures
 1-3 medals may be given to this group annually
Normally the total maximum of medals awarded each year is 12.

Notable recipients 

 King Frederik IX, 1957  
 Queen Ingrid, 1957  
 Princess Caroline-Mathilde of Denmark, 1965  
 Queen Margrethe II, 1974  
 Prince Henrik, 1984  
 Sir John Hodsoll, Senior NATO Advisor to the Committee on Civil Defense, 1959 
 Fire Inspector Henrik Sunekær, 1992  
 Fire Chief Carsten Iversen, Roskilde Brandvæsen, 2010 
 MP Bjarne Laustsen, President, 2010 
 Master Sergeant (CD) Jacob D. Madsen, Danish Emergency Management Agency , 2014 
 Major (CD) Sune Schønnemann, Deputy Regional Commander, youngest recipient of the award, 2019

References 

Orders, decorations, and medals of Denmark